Cryptomeria may refer to:
 Cryptomeria, a monotypic genus of conifer in the cypress family
 Cryptomeria (moth), a genus of moth
 Cryptomeria cipher, a cryptographic cipher